Dillon Paul Serna (born March 25, 1994) is an American professional soccer player who plays as a midfielder for Colorado Rapids 2 in MLS Next Pro. He previously played in Major League Soccer for Colorado Rapids and in the USL Championship for Sporting Kansas City II and Colorado Springs Switchbacks.

Career

Club
Serna joined the U.S. Soccer Development Academy with the Rapids' academy in 2009. After graduating from high school, he played one year of college soccer for the University of Akron, scoring two goals and contributing eight assists. He signed with the Rapids as a homegrown player in January 2013.

Serna made his MLS debut in a 3–0 loss to the Vancouver Whitecaps in the 2013 regular season finale.

Serna scored his first professional and his first MLS goal on April 26, 2014, in a 4–1 loss to the Seattle Sounders.

On November 21, 2019, the Rapids announced that Serna was out of contract with the club, but did not announce that they were working on a new contract. Serna was included on the Seattle Sounders 2020 preseason training roster as an unsigned player.

On February 28, 2020, the MLS veteran signed with USL Championship side Sporting Kansas City II.

Serna signed with USL Championship side Colorado Springs Switchbacks on January 28, 2021. His contract option wasn't picked up by the Switchbacks following the 2021 season.

International
Serna was selected by coach Wilmer Cabrera to be part of the United States U-17 squad for the 2011 FIFA U-17 World Cup. During the tournament, Serna did not feature in any of the four matches the United States played. Serna played in several matches with the United States U-20 team, but he was not part of the final squad that Tab Ramos selected to the 2013 FIFA U-20 World Cup.

He was called up to the United States senior squad for a friendly against Panama in February 2015.

Career statistics

Honors

Individual
 Mid-American Conference Men's Soccer Newcomer of the Year: 2012

References

External links

Akron profile
 

Living people
1994 births
American soccer players
Soccer players from Colorado
People from Thornton, Colorado
Association football midfielders
Akron Zips men's soccer players
Colorado Rapids players
Sporting Kansas City II players
Colorado Springs Switchbacks FC players
Major League Soccer players
Homegrown Players (MLS)
United States men's youth international soccer players
United States men's under-20 international soccer players
United States men's under-23 international soccer players
Sportspeople from the Denver metropolitan area
Colorado Rapids 2 players
MLS Next Pro players